The Argelia Fault is an inactive dextral oblique thrust fault in the departments of Risaralda and Valle del Cauca in Colombia.

Etymology 
The fault is named after Argelia, Valle del Cauca.

Description 
The Argelia Fault is located in the Western Ranges of the Colombian Andes, to the west of the city of Pereira. The fault cuts Mesozoic oceanic rocks that were accreted to the continent during Late Cretaceous time. The Argelia Fault shows some neotectonic features and probably connects with the Garrapatas Fault.

The vertical component of the fault is west-side up. Dextral movement in this fault is an exception to the common sinistral (left-lateral) movement of north–south trending faults in the region.

See also 

 List of earthquakes in Colombia
 Romeral Fault System

References

Bibliography

Maps 
 

Seismic faults of Colombia
Thrust faults
Strike-slip faults
Inactive faults
Faults
Faults